Never Been Kissed is a 1999 film starring Drew Barrymore.

Never Been Kissed may also refer to:

Literature
 Never Been Kissed, a novel by Melody Carlson
 Never Been Kissed, a novel of the novel series Mary-Kate and Ashley: Sweet 16 by Emma Harrison
 Never Been Kissed in the Same Place Twice, a novel by Allan Prior

Television
 "Never Been Kissed" (Glee), an episode of Glee
 "Never Been Kissed", an episode of the Canadian show History Bites

Music
 "Never Been Kissed", a song from the Sherrié Austin album, Love in the Real World
 "Never Been Kissed", a song from the Kristine W album, Stronger
 "Never Been Kissed", a song from the Nikki Webster album, Bliss
 "Never Been Kissed", a song written by lyricist Cy Coben and composer Charles Green, recorded separately by actor Jerry Lewis and bandleader Freddy Martin